The Class of COVID-19: Insights from the Inside is a collection of writing about the COVID-19 pandemic by students from Cliffside Park High School, in Cliffside Park, New Jersey, published on 2 June 2020. It contains pieces by forty-six students and was edited by Cliffside Park High School English teacher Shawn Adler. The collection was brought together, according to Adler, so that "people have this as a primary document for as long as they are learning about what we're going through in history."

The book has attracted national press coverage in the United States from CNN, the Wall Street Journal, NBC Nightly News, People, Yahoo, Al Día, and other outlets. It has also garnered praise from a range of New Jersey politicians, including Governor Phil Murphy, U.S. Senator Cory Booker, and Representative Bill Pascrell. A second volume, with twenty-four new pieces of writing by different student authors, appeared in January 2021.

References

Books about the COVID-19 pandemic
COVID-19 pandemic in New Jersey
COVID-19 pandemic in the United States
Coronavirus pandemic
Cliffside Park, New Jersey